Madagascar made its Paralympic Games début at the 2000 Summer Paralympics in Sydney. They were represented by vision impaired runner Aina Onja, who finished third in his men's T11 100m heat and failed to qualify for the next round.

Team 
Madagascar competed in its first Paralympic Games in Sydney. It sent a single athlete, blind runner Aina Onja, to compete in athletics.  The country then missed the 2004 Games in Athens.

Results

Agboessi ran in the first heat of his event, against Julio Requena of Spain and Edouard Agboessi of Benin, with Cuba's Jorge Jay Masso being a non-starter. Onja's time of 13.98 was the slowest of all the heats, ending his participation in the Games.

See also
Madagascar at the Paralympics
Madagascar at the 2000 Summer Olympics

References

External links
International Paralympic Committee

Nations at the 2000 Summer Paralympics
2000
Paralympics